105 may refer to:
105 (number), the number
AD 105, a year in the 2nd century AD
105 BC, a year in the 2nd century BC
105 (telephone number)
105 (MBTA bus)
105 (Northumberland) Construction Regiment, Royal Engineers, an English military unit
105th Regiment Royal Artillery
"105", a song by Kim Petras
"105", a 2003 song by Smash Mouth from the album Get the Picture?

See also
 10/5 (disambiguation)
Dubnium, chemical element with atomic number 105